KOI may refer to:

 the IATA airport code for Kirkwall Airport
 the Indonesian abbreviation of Komite Olimpiade Indonesia for Indonesian Olympic Committee
 the KOI character encodings for  Cyrillic script
 the KOI-18 cryptographic key fill device used by the U.S. government
 a Kepler Object of Interest
 language code for Komi-Permyak language
 Potassium hypoiodite

See also
 
 
 Koi (disambiguation)